The following outline is provided as an overview of and topical guide to Tajikistan:

Tajikistan – mountainous, landlocked, sovereign country located in Central Asia.  Tajikistan borders Afghanistan to the south, Uzbekistan to the west, Kyrgyzstan to the north, and China to the east.  Most of Tajikistan's population belongs to the Tajik ethnic group, who share culture and history with the Persian peoples and speak the Tajik language, a modern variety of Persian.  Once part of the Samanid Empire, Tajikistan became a constituent republic of the Soviet Union in the 20th century, known as the Tajik Soviet Socialist Republic (Tajik SSR).

After independence, Tajikistan suffered from a devastating civil war which lasted from 1992 to  1997.  Since the end of the war, newly established political stability and foreign aid have allowed the country's economy to grow.  Its natural resources such as cotton and aluminium have contributed greatly to this steady improvement, although observers have characterized the country as having few natural resources besides hydroelectric power and its strategic location.

General reference 

 Pronunciation: 
 Common English country name:  Tajikistan
 Official English country name:  The Republic of Tajikistan
 Common endonym(s): Tojikiston, Тоҷикистон
 Official endonym(s): Jumhurii Tojikiston, Ҷумҳурии Тоҷикистон
 Adjectival(s): Tajikistani
 Demonym(s): Tajikistani, Tajik
 Etymology: Name of Tajikistan
 ISO country codes:  TJ, TJK, 762
 ISO region codes:  See ISO 3166-2:TJ
 Internet country code top-level domain:  .tj

Geography of Tajikistan 

Geography of Tajikistan
 Tajikistan is: a landlocked country
 Location:
 Northern Hemisphere and Eastern Hemisphere
 Eurasia
 Asia
 Central Asia
 Time zone:  UTC+05
 Extreme points of Tajikistan
 High:  Ismoil Somoni Peak 
 Low:  Syr Darya 
 Land boundaries:  3,651 km
 1,206 km
 1,161 km
 870 km
 414 km
 Coastline:  none
 Population of Tajikistan: 7,215,700 (Jan. 2008 estimate) – 99th most populous country
 Area of Tajikistan:  – 95th in the world
 Atlas of Tajikistan

Environment of Tajikistan 

Environment of Tajikistan
 Climate of Tajikistan
 Environmental issues in Tajikistan
 Wildlife of Tajikistan
 Fauna of Tajikistan
 Birds of Tajikistan
 Mammals of Tajikistan

Natural geographic features of Tajikistan 

 Glaciers of Tajikistan
 Islands of Tajikistan: none
 Lakes of Tajikistan
 Mountains of Tajikistan
 Rivers of Tajikistan
 World Heritage Sites in Tajikistan: none

Regions of Tajikistan 

Regions of Tajikistan

Ecoregions of Tajikistan

Administrative divisions of Tajikistan 

.

 Regions of Tajikistan
 Districts of Tajikistan
 Municipalities of Tajikistan

Provinces of Tajikistan 

Provinces of Tajikistan
1 Sughd
2 Region of Republican Subordination
3 Khatlon
4 Gorno-Badakhshan

Districts of Tajikistan 

Districts of Tajikistan

Municipalities of Tajikistan 

Municipalities of Tajikistan
 Capital of Tajikistan: Dushanbe
 Cities of Tajikistan

Demography of Tajikistan 

Demographics of Tajikistan

Government and politics of Tajikistan 

Politics of Tajikistan
 Form of government: unitary presidential republic
 Capital of Tajikistan: Dushanbe
 Elections in Tajikistan
 Political parties in Tajikistan

Branches of the government of Tajikistan 

Government of Tajikistan

Executive branch of the government of Tajikistan 
 Head of state and head of government: President of Tajikistan, Emomali Rahmon
 Cabinet of Tajikistan
Prime Minister of Tajikistan, Kokhir Rasulzoda (since 2013)

Legislative branch of the government of Tajikistan 

 Parliament of Tajikistan (bicameral)
 Upper house: Senate of Tajikistan
 Lower house: House of Commons of Tajikistan

Judicial branch of the government of Tajikistan 

Court system of Tajikistan

Foreign relations of Tajikistan 

Foreign relations of Tajikistan
 Diplomatic missions in Tajikistan
 Diplomatic missions of Tajikistan

International organization membership 

International organization membership of Tajikistan
The Republic of Tajikistan is a member of:

Asian Development Bank (ADB)
Collective Security Treaty Organization (CSTO)
Commonwealth of Independent States (CIS)
Economic Cooperation Organization (ECO)
Eurasian Economic Community (EAEC)
Euro-Atlantic Partnership Council (EAPC)
European Bank for Reconstruction and Development (EBRD)
Food and Agriculture Organization (FAO)
General Confederation of Trade Unions (GCTU)
International Atomic Energy Agency (IAEA)
International Bank for Reconstruction and Development (IBRD)
International Civil Aviation Organization (ICAO)
International Criminal Court (ICCt)
International Criminal Police Organization (Interpol)
International Development Association (IDA)
International Federation of Red Cross and Red Crescent Societies (IFRCS)
International Finance Corporation (IFC)
International Fund for Agricultural Development (IFAD)
International Labour Organization (ILO)
International Monetary Fund (IMF)
International Olympic Committee (IOC)
International Organization for Migration (IOM)
International Organization for Standardization (ISO) (correspondent)

International Red Cross and Red Crescent Movement (ICRM)
International Telecommunication Union (ITU)
International Telecommunications Satellite Organization (ITSO)
Inter-Parliamentary Union (IPU)
Islamic Development Bank (IDB)
Multilateral Investment Guarantee Agency (MIGA)
Organisation of Islamic Cooperation (OIC)
Organization for Security and Cooperation in Europe (OSCE)
Organisation for the Prohibition of Chemical Weapons (OPCW)
Partnership for Peace (PFP)
Shanghai Cooperation Organisation (SCO)
United Nations (UN)
United Nations Conference on Trade and Development (UNCTAD)
United Nations Educational, Scientific, and Cultural Organization (UNESCO)
United Nations Industrial Development Organization (UNIDO)
Universal Postal Union (UPU)
World Customs Organization (WCO)
World Federation of Trade Unions (WFTU)
World Health Organization (WHO)
World Intellectual Property Organization (WIPO)
World Meteorological Organization (WMO)
World Tourism Organization (UNWTO)
World Trade Organization (WTO) (observer)

Law and order in Tajikistan 

Law of Tajikistan
 Capital punishment in Tajikistan
 Constitution of Tajikistan
 Human rights in Tajikistan
 LGBT rights in Tajikistan
 Freedom of religion in Tajikistan
 Law enforcement in Tajikistan

Military of Tajikistan 

Military of Tajikistan
 Commander-in-chief (President of Tajikistan)
 Presidential National Guard
 Ministry of Defence
 Tajik National Army
 Tajik Air Force
 Tajik Mobile Forces
 Ministry of the Interior
 Border Troops
 Internal Troops
 Military history of Tajikistan

Local government in Tajikistan 

Local government in Tajikistan

History of Tajikistan 

History of Tajikistan
 Economic history of Tajikistan
 Military history of Tajikistan

Culture of Tajikistan 

Culture of Tajikistan
 Cuisine of Tajikistan
 Ethnic minorities in Tajikistan
 Gender equality in Tajikistan
 Languages of Tajikistan
 Media in Tajikistan
 National symbols of Tajikistan
 Coat of arms of Tajikistan
 Flag of Tajikistan
 National anthem of Tajikistan
 People of Tajikistan
 Prostitution in Tajikistan
 Public holidays in Tajikistan
 Religion in Tajikistan
 Buddhism in Tajikistan
 Christianity in Tajikistan
 Islam in Tajikistan
 Judaism in Tajikistan
 Sikhism in Tajikistan
 World Heritage Sites in Tajikistan: NONE

Art in Tajikistan 
 Cinema of Tajikistan
 Literature of Tajikistan
 Music of Tajikistan

Sports in Tajikistan 

Sports in Tajikistan
 Football in Tajikistan
 Tajikistan at the Olympics

Economy and infrastructure of Tajikistan 

Economy of Tajikistan
 Economic rank, by nominal GDP (2007): 145th (one hundred and forty fifth)
 Agriculture in Tajikistan
 Banking in Tajikistan
 National Bank of Tajikistan
 Communications in Tajikistan
 Internet in Tajikistan
 Currency of Tajikistan: Somoni
ISO 4217: TJS
 Economic history of Tajikistan
 Energy in Tajikistan
 Energy policy of Tajikistan
 Oil industry in Tajikistan
 Health care in Tajikistan
 Mining in Tajikistan
 Tourism in Tajikistan
 Transport in Tajikistan
 Airports in Tajikistan
 Rail transport in Tajikistan

Education in Tajikistan 

Education in Tajikistan

Health in Tajikistan 

Health in Tajikistan

See also 

Tajikistan
List of international rankings
List of Tajikistan-related topics
Member state of the United Nations
Outline of Asia

References

External links 

 More detailed map of Tajikistan
 
 Tajikistan. The World Factbook. Central Intelligence Agency.
 

Tajikistan
 1